Raymond Strong (born May 7, 1956) is a former American football running back in the National Football League who played for the Atlanta Falcons. He played college football for the UNLV Rebels. He also played in the Canadian Football League for the BC Lions.

References

1956 births
Living people
American football running backs
Canadian football running backs
Atlanta Falcons players
BC Lions players
UNLV Rebels football players